Atkinson may refer to:

Places 
Atkinson, Nova Scotia, Canada
, a village in Dominica
Atkinson, Illinois, U.S.
Atkinson, Indiana, U.S.
Atkinson, Maine, U.S.
Atkinson Lake, a lake in Minnesota, U.S.
Atkinson, Nebraska, U.S.
Atkinson, New Hampshire, U.S.
Atkinson, North Carolina, U.S.

Other uses 
 Atkinson (surname)
 Atkinsons, a department store in Sheffield, England, U.K.
 Atkinson Candy Company, Texasd Candy company
 Atkinson Clock Tower, clock tower in Kota Kinabalu, Sabah, Malaysia
 Atkinson cycle, asymmetrical thermodynamic cycle
 Atkinson Film-Arts, former Canadian animation studio
 Atkinson Graduate School of Management for the Willamette University MBA program
 Atkinson Hyperlegible, a typeface
 Atkinson resistance, characterizing airflow
 Seddon Atkinson, British truck company

See also
Atkinson Point, Northwest Territories, a community in the Northwest Territories, Canada
Atkinson Township (disambiguation)
Fort Atkinson, Wisconsin, U.S.
Justice Atkinson (disambiguation)